CTown Supermarkets is a chain of independently owned and operated supermarkets operating in the northeastern United States.

CTown was founded in 1975. CTown uses economies of scale so its small member stores can pool their resources for purchasing and advertising. CTown tends to open supermarkets in locations that suburban stores have abandoned. CTown Supermarkets tend to depend on more customers who are pedestrians and fewer who drive, as shown by their smaller parking lots.

There are approximately 200 stores in Connecticut, Massachusetts, New Jersey, New York, and Pennsylvania. CTown is the fifth-largest food retailer in the New York City metropolitan area. CTown is supplied by Krasdale Foods; many products sold in CTown stores are labeled Krasdale Foods (Krasdale also is a supplier for the smaller Bravo supermarket chain). Marketing and advertising for CTown are handled by Alpha-I Marketing Corp.

References

External links
 CTown website
 Krasdale Foods website

Companies based in New York (state)
Economy of the Northeastern United States
Supermarkets of the United States
American companies established in 1975
Retail companies established in 1975